In physics and mathematics, the Klein–Kramers equation or sometimes referred as Kramers–Chandrasekhar equation is a partial differential equation that describes the probability density function  of a 
Brownian particle in phase space .

In this case, the Klein–Kramers equation is

In  spatial dimensions, the equation is

The fractional Klein-Kramers equation is a generalization that incorporates anomalous diffusion by way of fractional calculus.

Physical basis
The physical model underlying the Klein–Kramers equation is that of an underdamped Brownian particle. Unlike standard Brownian motion, which is overdamped, underdamped Brownian motion takes the friction to be finite, in which case the momentum remains an independent degree of freedom. 

Mathematically, a particle's state is described by its position  and momentum , which evolve in time according to the Langevin equations

These equations are analogous to Newton's second law of motion, but due to the noise term  are stochastic ("random") rather than deterministic.

The dynamics can also be described in terms of a probability density function , which gives the probability, at time , of finding a particle at position  and with momentum . By averaging over the stochastic trajectories from the Langevin equations,  can be shown to obey the Klein–Kramers equation.

Solution in free space

where

This special solution is also known as the Green's function , and can be used to construct the general solution, i.e., the solution for generic initial conditions :

Similarly, the 3D free-space problem with point-source initial condition  has solution

Asymptotic behavior
Under certain conditions, the solution of the free-space Klein–Kramers equation behaves asymptotically like a diffusion process. For example, if

then the density  satisfies

where  is the free-space Green's function for the diffusion equation.

Solution near boundaries
The 1D, time-independent, force-free version of the Klein–Kramers equation can be solved on a semi-infinite or bounded domain by separation of variables. The solution typically develops a boundary layer that varies rapidly in space and is non-analytic at the boundary itself.

A well-posed problem prescribes boundary data on only half of the  domain: the positive half at the left boundary and the negative half at the right.

for some function .

For a point-source boundary condition, the solution has an exact expression in terms of infinite sum and products: Here, the result is stated for the non-dimensional version of the Klein–Kramers equation:

where

This result can be obtained by the Wiener–Hopf method. However, practical use of the expression is limited by slow convergence of the series, particularly for values of  close to 0.

See also
Fokker–Planck equation
Ornstein–Uhlenbeck process
Wiener process
Linear transport theory
Neutron transport

References

Partial differential equations